Lakkomata Λακκώματα is a mountain village and community in the municipality of Erymanthos in Achaea, Greece. According to the 2011 census, the village had 113 inhabitants, and the community, which also includes the village Tsapournia, 133 inhabitants.

Geography
Lakkomata is located in the upper valley of the river Peiros, at the northwestern foot of the mountain Erymanthos, at an elevation of 610 m above sea level. It is 11 km southeast of Chalandritsa, 25 km southeast of Patras and 22 km west of Kalavryta.

History
The village was mentioned in a 1700 Venetian text by Grimani under the name "Licomati di Nexero" (Λυκομάτι Νεζερού) and had 129 inhabitants. After the Greek War of Independence, it became part of the municipality of Nezera in 1835. That municipality was dissolved in 1841 and Lakkomata became part of the municipality of Fares. It became an independent community in 1912. In 1997 under the Kapodistrias reform, it became part of the municipality of Farres, which became part of the municipality of Erymanthos in 2011.

Historical population

References

Further reading
Gkourvelos, Spyridon N. En tais ton Nezeron komais, Istoria ton Nezeron (History of Nezera), Petros Koulis Written Arts, Patras, 2007 , .
Christos K. Koryllou Chorografia tis Elladas (Χωρογραφία της Ελλάδος), I., Achaia Department, Anesti Konstantinidou Publishers, En Athinais, 1903 
Vasilis K. Lazaris, Stefanos N. Thomopoulos, History of the City of Patras from Ancient Times to 1821 (Ιστορία της Πόλεως Πατρών από αρχαιοτάτων χρόνων μέχρι του 1821), 4th ed. in Modern Greek, Vol. I, Achaikes Ekdoseis, Patras, 1998. .

External links
Lakkomata, Visit Erymanthos 

Populated places in Achaea